The Stele of Serapeitis is a funerary stele with bilingual inscriptions written in Ancient Greek and Armazic, a local idiom of Aramaic, found in 1940, at Armazi, near Mtskheta, in the ancient capital of the Kingdom of Iberia. The stele memorialises a short-lived Georgian princess named Serapeitis. The inscriptions mention Georgian monarchs, Pharnavaz I and Pharasmanes II, and other members of aristocracy. The inscriptions are dated 150 AD. It is known as KAI 276.

Inscriptions

Ancient Greek inscription

Aramaic inscription

Notes

References

Bibliography
Opper, T. (2013) Hadrian: Art, Politics and Economy, British Museum, 
Rapp, Stephen H. Jr (2014) The Sasanian World through Georgian Eyes: Caucasia and the Iranian Commonwealth in Late Antique Georgian Literature, Ashgate Publishing 
Lang, D. M. (1966) Landmarks in Georgian Literature, School of Oriental and African Studies, University of Michigan

Further reading
Tsereteli, G. (1942) Armazi Bilingual, XIII, Tbilisi
Shanidze, A. (1941) Bilinguals from Armazi, V. II, Tbilisi
Kaukhchishvili, S. (1941) Greek inscriptions of Armazi, V. II, Tbilisi

2nd-century sculptures
2nd-century inscriptions
1940 archaeological discoveries
Archaeological artifacts
Roman-era Greek inscriptions
Aramaic inscriptions
KAI inscriptions
Multilingual texts
Pharnavazid dynasty
Funerary steles
Monuments and memorials in Tbilisi
Monuments and memorials to women